Ossun is an unincorporated community and census-designated place in Lafayette Parish, Louisiana, United States. In 2020, its population was 2,145. The community is named after the area of Ossun, France, near Lourdes.

Geography
Ossun is in northwestern Lafayette Parish, around the intersection of Louisiana Highway 93 and Louisiana Highway 723.

Demographics 

As of the 2020 United States census, there were 2,145 people, 609 households, and 406 families residing in the CDP.

References

Census-designated places in Louisiana
Census-designated places in Lafayette Parish, Louisiana
Acadiana
Census-designated places in Lafayette metropolitan area, Louisiana